Ronnie Uys (born 19 April 1979) is a South African rugby union player, currently playing with RC Narbonne in the French Rugby Pro D2 competition.

References

South African rugby union players
Living people
1979 births
Leopards (rugby union) players
Sharks (Currie Cup) players
Pumas (Currie Cup) players
Eastern Province Elephants players
Free State Cheetahs players
Rugby union props
Rugby union players from Pretoria